Earthquake insurance for earthquakes in Turkey is compulsory for residential buildings in urban areas. However it is often not enforced.

The Turkish Catastrophe Insurance Pool was created shortly after the 1999 İzmit earthquake and is making payments for the 2023 Turkey–Syria earthquake.

References

Earthquakes in Turkey
Insurance